Brithdir Mawr is an intentional community in Pembrokeshire, South Wales.

Community
The community is based on an  farm. It is currently home to 10 adults and 7 children who live in individual family flats around the farmyard. The land is farmed organically (although not certified, partly due to cost, mostly due to the belief that chemical farmers should pay for certification to show their food is safe rather than traditional, organic food growers incurring financial penalties) and the community is off-grid for supplies of water, electricity and wood for fuel - used for heating and cooking.

People work both locally and on-site to manage the farm and earn a living. The aim of the community is to live an environmentally sustainable and ethical lifestyle. Their three "pillars" are community, sustainability and education. In 2017 they owned four horses, three goats, four geese, four ducks and three beehives. They are currently looking for investors, income generating ideas and new members.

History
In 1993, architectural historian Julian Orbach and his wife Emma Orbach set up the community  in the foothills of Mynydd Carningli (Angel Mountain), near Newport, Pembrokeshire within the Pembrokeshire Coast National Park without planning permission or publicity. The Orbachs initially renovated a rundown farmhouse and moved in with their three children. Other buildings were built, including a roundhouse with a turf roof, later to become known as That Roundhouse,  a wooden marquee, a wood store and a workshop. The community in 1998 consisted of 12 adults and 10 children who were mainly vegetarian, grew their own crops and lived off the land.

In 1998 the settlement, which then also included five straw bale buildings and one wooden geodesic dome, was spotted from the air and reported to the authorities. The authorities identified fourteen infringements of planning regulations, including the lake, the cycle shed, the Dome, and the roundhouse.  All infringements, except those relating to the Roundhouse, were  resolved. In 2019 the cycle shed was still without planning permission.

In about 2001 the land was split in three parts, with ownership of the land around the disputed roundhouse being transferred to the Roundhouse Trust. Julian Orbach moved into town, but retained ownership of about  including the old farmhouse and outbuildings, which was leased to the Brithdir Mawr Housing Co-op. Emma Orbach adopted the rest, which is known as Tir Ysbrydol (spirit land), and became involved in planning negotiations in relation to new and existing straw bale round huts and structures.

In 2015 Emma featured in an episode of Ben Fogle: New Lives in the Wild.

In 2016 the community was notified by Julian Orbach, the current owner, of his intention not to renew the lease from 2020. The community members were offered first refusal to purchase the site at a price of £1 million. However, according to the community's website, the owner then granted them a six year extension of the lease.

See also
 Low-impact development (UK)

References

External links
 Brithdir Mawr community homepage
 That Roundhouse homepage

Villages in Pembrokeshire
Utopian communities
Ecovillages
Populated places established in 1993
Intentional communities in the United Kingdom
1993 establishments in Wales
Newport, Pembrokeshire